Basantrai is a village in the Basantrai CD block in the Godda subdivision of the Godda district in the Indian state of Jharkhand.

Geography

Location                                          

Overview
Rajmahal coalfield is shown in the map. The entire area is overwhelmingly rural with only small pockets of urbanisation.

Note: The full screen map is interesting. All places marked on the map are linked and you can easily move on to another page of your choice. Enlarge the map to see what else is there – one gets railway links, many more road links and so on.

Demographics
According to the 2011 Census of India, Basantrai had a total population of 581, of which 307(53%) were males and 274 (47%) were females. Population in the age range 0–6 years was 120. The total number of literate persons in Basantrai was 393 (85.25% of the population over 6 years).

Civic administration

Police station
Basantrai police station serves the Basantrai CD block.

CD block HQ
Headquarters of Basantrai CD block is at Basantrai village.

Education
M.A. Kalam Azad Degree College, Basantrai, is affiliated with Sido Kanhu Murmu University. Established in 1985, this college has facilities for teaching in classes XI and XII (Intermediate).

References

Villages in Godda district